The Embassy of Lebanon in Washington, D.C. is the Republic of Lebanon's diplomatic mission to the United States. It is located at 2560 28th Street, Northwest, Washington, D.C., in the Woodley Park neighborhood. 

The embassy also operates Consulates-General in Los Angeles, Detroit, New York City and Las Vegas.

The ambassador is Gabriel Issa.

References

External links
Official website
wikimapia

Lebanon
Washington, D.C.
Lebanon–United States relations